This is a list of notable people who were born or raised in Shanghai, China, or have spent a large or formative part of their life in that city.

Native Shanghainese

B 
Bao Jianfeng (born 1975) – actor and singer

C 
Eileen Chang (1920–1995) – writer
Chin Tsi-ang (1909–2007) – Hong Kong actress

D 
Dai Xiangyu (born 1984) – actor and model
Ding Yuxi (born 1995) – actor

F 
Jerry Fujio (1940–2021) – Japanese singer, actor and tarento
Feng Shaofeng (born 1978) – actor

G 
Seven Gao, singer
Ben Gu (born 1961) – librarian, translator and library science researcher
Guo Liang (born 1968) – Singaporean actor and television presenter

H 
Fan Ho (1931–2016) – photographer, film director and actor
Huang Yu (1916–2013) – actor and filmmaker

J 
Jing Chao (born 1986) – actor
Edward Judd (1932–2009) – British actor
Ju Wenjun (born 1991) – chess grandmaster and Women's World Champion from 2018–present.

K 
Ku Feng (born 1930) – Hong Kong actor
Burt Kwouk (1930–2016) – British actor

L 
Lai Hang (1928–1965) – actor
Lydia Li – TV presenter and actress
Lu Jinhua (1927–2018) – Yue opera artist

M 
Ma Yili (born 1976) – actress
Mei Baojiu (1934–2016) – Peking opera artist and politician

O 
Henry O (born 1927) – actor

Q 
Qian Zhijun (born 1987) – actor
Qiao Renliang (1987–2016) – singer and actor

S 
Josephine Siao (born 1947) – Hong Kong actress
Sze Yu (born 1962) – Australian actor and former badminton player

T 
Kaiji Tang (born 1984) – voice actor
Kenneth Tsang (born 1935) – Hong Kong actor

W 
Wei Zongwan (born 1938) – actor
Wu Pang (1909–2000) – Hong Kong filmmaker

X 
Xu Zheng (born 1972) – actor and filmmaker
Joker Xue (born 1983) – singer-songwriter

Y 
Yan Shunkai (1937–2017) – actor and comedian
Yueh Hua (1942–2018) – Hong Kong actor

Z 
Zheng Junli (1911–1969) – actor and filmmaker
Zhu Guanghu (born 1949) – football coach, actor and former footballer
Zhong Chenle (born 2001) – singer; member of K-Pop group NCT
Zhou Guanyu (born 1999) – Formula One driver

Non-native Shanghainese 

These people were not born or adopted in Shanghai and raised elsewhere but are well known for living in Shanghai.

B 
Ba Jin (1904–2005) – writer; born and raised in Chengdu, Sichuan

L 
Lu Xun (1881–1936) – writer, literary critic, and educator; born and raised in Shaoxing, Zhejiang

S 
Su Qing (1914–1982) – writer; born and raised in Ningbo, Zhejiang

Z 
Zhang Chunqiao (1917–2005) – politician and writer; born and raised in Juye County, Shandong

Lists of people by city in China
 
People